The 2004 United Nations Climate Change Conference took place between December 6 and December 17, 2004 in Buenos Aires, Argentina. The conference included the 10th Conference of the Parties (COP10) to the United Nations Framework Convention on Climate Change (UNFCCC).

The parties discussed the progress made since the first United Nations Climate Change Conference ten years ago and its future challenges, with special emphasis on climate change mitigation and adaptation. To promote developing countries better adapt to climate change, the Buenos Aires Plan of Action was adopted. The parties also began discussing the post-Kyoto mechanism, on how to allocate emission reduction obligation following 2012, when the first commitment period ends.

References

21st-century diplomatic conferences (UN)
Diplomatic conferences in Argentina
2004
Events in Buenos Aires
2004
2004 in international relations
2004 in the environment
2004 in Argentina
2000s in Buenos Aires
December 2004 events